Frank Jirouch (March 3, 1878 – May 2, 1970) was an American sculptor. His work was part of the sculpture event in the art competition at the 1932 Summer Olympics.

References

1878 births
1970 deaths
20th-century American sculptors
20th-century American male artists
American male sculptors
Olympic competitors in art competitions
People from Cleveland